The Alesha Show is the second studio album by English singer Alesha Dixon. It was released by Asylum Records on 24 November 2008 in the United Kingdom. Her first album to be released domestically following the cancellation of her debut album Fired Up (2006), Dixon used her full name for the first time while releasing The Alesha Show after previously being credited mononymously. Producers on the album include Brian Higgins and Xenomania as well as Steve Booker, Harvey Mason, Jr., Kuk Harrell, Stephen Lipson, Soulshock & Karlin, Alex da Kid, and Al Shux.

The album debuted and peaked at number 11 on the UK Albums Chart and reached the top 30 in Finland and Spain. In the UK, it was eventually certified platinum by the British Phonographic Industry (BPI) for sales in excess of 300,000 units. The Alesha Show was preceded by the Xenomania-produced single "The Boy Does Nothing," which became a top ten and a gold-seller in the United Kingdom. A deluxe edition of the album, entitled The Alesha Show – Encore, was released on 23 November 2009. The first single from the Encore edition was "To Love Again". All the singles released from the album, including the Encore edition, reached the top 15 on the UK Singles Chart.

Critical reception

At Metacritic, which assigns a normalized rating out of 100 to reviews from mainstream critics, The Alesha Show has an average score of 68 based on 4 reviews, indicating "generally favorable reviews," Allmusic editor Jon O'Brien found that "the seven songs produced by the team behind Girls Aloud is full of exciting, hook-laden, spiky dance-pop [...] Much more inventive than expected, The Alesha Show cleverly manages to appeal to both the older Strictly crowd who revitalized her fortunes, and the younger Radio 1 crowd who supported her earlier girl-band days."

Alex Foster of the BBC praised Dixon on launching a well orchestrated comeback, saying "Modern celebrity is a fickle beast. After it chews you up and spits you out only a few are rewarded for their resilience with one more bite of the cherry". However, Foster continued onwards criticising Dixon's apparent genre change, stating "Is this the Britney of old? A rhymes-spitting, N.E.R.D video featuring, uniquely British R&B vixen that can ace rather than ape the Americans? The answer sadly is 'no'". However Foster did praise tracks such as "Breathe Slow" and "Hand It Over".

Nick Levine of Digital Spy stated that "Dixon tries her hand at everything from 60s glitz ('Cinderella Shoe') to synthy R&B ('Breathe Slow') to mellow ballads ('Don't Let Me Go'), managing more often that not to pull it off [...] Not unsurprisingly given its relentless genre-hopping, The Alesha Show does feature a few misfires. 'Ooh Baby I Like It Like That' sounds like a Dannii Minogue B-side from 2003". However, the review ended on an optimistic note, saying that "these quibbles aren't enough to sink an album that's often as lively and likable as the woman who made it".

Commercial performance
The Alesha Show entered the UK Albums Chart at number twenty-six, selling over 26,000 copies. It dropped off the top 75 chart after four weeks. The album slowly climbed up the chart and, after the success of second single "Breathe Slow," it rose to a new peak of 12, giving the album its first top-twenty chart placing. Following the release of third single "Let's Get Excited", it rebounded to a new peak of 11. It also reached number seven on the UK Digital Albums. On 12 December 2008, The Alesha Show was certified gold by the British Phonographic Industry (BPI). On 22 July 2013, it gained platinum status, indicating sales in excess of 300,000 copies.

Elsewhere, The Alesha Show peaked at number 20 on the Scottish Albums Chart and entered the top 30 in Finland and Spain where it peaked at number 23 in both countries. It also entered the top 40 in France, reaching number 39.

Promotion

Singles
 "The Boy Does Nothing" was released as the first single from the album. It became a worldwide hit and her best single to date. It became a top 5 hit in the United Kingdom. A top 10 hit in Australia, France, Norway, Italy, Romania, Greece, Spain, the Netherlands, Finland, Hungary, Sweden, and Switzerland. It also became at top 20 hit in Belgium, Ireland and Slovakia, as well as a top 40 hit in Austria, Denmark and Germany.
 "Breathe Slow" is the second single from the album. The track is Dixon's most successful single to date in the UK, peaking at number 3. The song was nominated at the BRIT awards 2010 in the Best British single category. It also became a top 20 hit in Belgium, the Czech Republic and Ireland.
 "Let's Get Excited" is the third single. It peaked at number 13 in the UK, number 14 in Finland, and number 36 in Ireland.
 "To Love Again" is the lead and only single from the Encore edition of the album. The song is produced by John Shanks and was written by Gary Barlow of Take That. The song peaked at number 15 in the United Kingdom and number 23 in Scotland.

Other songs
A promotional song called "Colours of the Rainbow" was made available to download from Dixon's official website.

Tour

In summer 2009 it was announced that Dixon would tour across the UK in support of The Alesha Show. Dixon named the 17 date concert tour "The Alesha Show". The tour is due to begin on 20 October in Nottingham and finish on 19 November in Brighton. Dixon had to reschedule three shows when it was announced that she would take on the role of judge on Strictly Come Dancing.

Track listing

Sample credits
 "Don't Ever Let Me Go" samples "Paper Aeroplane" by Angus & Julia Stone.

Charts

Weekly charts

Year-end charts

Certifications

Release history

References

2008 albums
Alesha Dixon albums
Albums produced by Soulshock and Karlin
Albums produced by Xenomania
Albums produced by Alex da Kid
Asylum Records albums
Albums produced by Kuk Harrell